Tiffany Celine Ho (born 6 January 1998) is an Australian badminton player. She was the champion at the 2016 Oceania Championships in the women's doubles event partnered with Jennifer Tam, and at the same year, she claimed her first international title at the Waikato International tournament in the women's doubles event. Ho was part of Australia team that won the women's team title at the 2020 Oceania Championships.

Achievements

Oceania Championships 
Women's singles

Women's doubles

Mixed doubles

BWF International Challenge/Series 
Women's doubles

  BWF International Challenge tournament
  BWF International Series tournament
  BWF Future Series tournament

References

External links 
 

Living people
1998 births
Sportspeople from Sydney
Sportswomen from New South Wales
Australian people of Hong Kong descent
Australian female badminton players
Badminton players at the 2022 Commonwealth Games
Commonwealth Games competitors for Australia
20th-century Australian women
21st-century Australian women